John Norum (born 23 February 1964) is a Norwegian-Swedish rock guitarist and one of the founders of the Swedish rock band Europe. Concurrent to his role with Europe, he also maintains a career as a solo artist.

Studio albums

Extended plays

Live albums

Singles

Music videos

Collaborations

References

Discographies of Norwegian artists
Heavy metal discographies